Khalid Atef Abdul Ghaffar (born 24 November 1962) is a former Minister of Higher Education and Scientific Research, and the current Minister of Health and Population in Egypt.

He is also Acting Minister of Health and Population since October 2021.

Career 
He headed the Department of Oral Medicine, Periodontolgy, Diagnosis and Radiology at the Faculty of Dentistry, Ain Shams University, from 2009 to November 2015. He was appointed Dean of Dentistry in Ain Shams in 2014, contributing to the introduction of state-of-the-art dental equipment. He was appointed Vice President for Graduate Studies and Research and was awarded the State Encouragement Prize in Medical Sciences and published 20 research papers in international journals and magazines.

Publications 
1. Lloyed DR, MO Wasfy, K. Atef, G. Minah and W. Falkler: Microbiological profile of advanced periodontal lesions in Egyptian J Dent Res, 1991

2. Cutler CW, Wasfy MO, Ghaffar K, Hosni M, Lloyed DR: Impaired bactericidal activity of PMN from two brothers with necrotizing ulcerative gingivo-

periodontitis. J Periodont; 64: 357-363, 1994

3. Ghaffar KA, Wasfy MO, Cutler CW: Impaired killing of Prevotella intermedia by polymorphonuclear leukocytes (PMN) from early-onset periodontitis

(EOP) patients. J Dent Res (abs), March 1994

4. Parlar A, Cafesse R, Rossmann JA, Oygurt, Balos K, Nasjietic, Ghaffar KA: In-vivo separation of periodontal ligament and bone cells. Euro Perio,

Paris, May 1994

5. Ghaffar KA, Cutler CW, Brown RS: Prevalence of HIV in Egyptian dentists as determined by ELISA. Oral Surg., Oral Med., Oral Pathol., December

1994

6. Hala K, Abdel-Gaber, Manal M Hosni, Khaled A Ghaffar: Clinical, bacteriological and immunological examination as well as treatment of a patient

with Chediak Higashi syndrome. Egyptian Dental Journal; 1995

7. Khaled A, Abdel Ghaffar, Hala K, Abdel-Gaber, Nivine I Raggy: Specific antibody response to subgingival microflora from juvenile periodontitis

patients in the Egyptian population. Egyptian Dental Journal, 42: 1537-1543, 1996

8. Cutler CW, Ghaffar KA: A short-term study of the effect of SBHAN, a Novel compound, on gingival inflammation in the beagle dog. J Periodontol;

68: 448455, 1997
9. Khaled Abdel Ghaffar: Implant management of the periodontally compromised patient. Proceedings of the Second International Implantology
Conference, p. 122-125, 1997
10. Ghaffar KA, Manal MH: Periodontal disease in immunologically compromised patients. Proceedings of the 8th International Dental Congress, p. 53,
1997
11. Rossmann JA, Parlar A, Ghaffar KA, Israel M: Use of carbon dioxide laser in guided tissue regeneration wound healing in beagle dogs. Ain Shams
Dental Journal; 1: 67-79, 1998
12. El-Shamt M, Ghaffar KA, Brown RS, Ajagbe O: Extra-nodal non- Hodgkin’s Lymphoma of the oral cavity. A case report. The American Dental
Institute for Continuing Education; 66: 19-23, 1998
13. Ghaffar KA, Zahran FM, Fahmy HM, Brown RS: Immunologic and genetic assessment of Papillon-Lefevre syndrome among Egyptians. Journal of
Dental Research (abstract) 276, 1998
14. Hart TC, Bowden DW, Ghaffar KA, Wang W, Cutler CW, Cebeci I, Efeoglu A, Firatii E: Sublocalization of the Papillon-Lefevre syndrome locus on 1
lq14-21. American Journal of Medical Genetics; 79: 134-139, 1998
15. Ghaffar KA, Zahran FM, Fahmy HM, Brown RS: Papillon-Lefevre syndrome: neutrophil function in 15 cases from 4 families in Egypt. Oral Surg, Oral
Med, Oral Pathol, Oral Radiol;88: 320-325, 1999
16. Khaled A. Abdel-Ghaffar: Lichen pinuus and hepatitis C virus in the Egyptian population. Ain Shams Dental Journal; 2: 245-253, 1999
17. Khaled Abdel-Ghaffar: The use of carbon dioxide laser in the management of different types of gingival hyperplasia. Cairo Dental Journal; 15: 4,
1999
18. Nalin Thakker, Jackline James, Khaled A. Ghaffar: Loss of function mutations in cathepsin C results in periodontal disease and palmoplantar
keratosis. Nature Genetics; 23: 421-424, 1999
19. K.A. Abdel-Ghaffar, N.I. Ragy, and M.O. Wasfy: The Predominant Cultivable Microflora of Early-Onset Periodontitis (EOP) in Egypt, Cairo Dent. J.,
l6(5): 405-410, 2000
20. K.A. Ghaffar, M.M. Hosny, and S. Garrett: Enamel matrix proteins and bioabsorbable membrane in the treatment of early-onset periodontitis. J.Dent.
Res. IADR, Chicago, 2001
21. Mohamed El-Shahat, Khaled A. Abdel-Ghaffar, Akram El-Awady: Impaired intracellular killing and chemotaxis of polymorphonuclear leukocyte
(PMN) from early-onset periodontitis patients. Ain Shams Dental Journal, volume IV, no. 4, 173-180, Dec. 2001
22. A. El Awady, K.S. Deiffallah, K.A. Abdel-Ghaffar, G. Kenawy: Tumor Necrosis Factor Alpha and Prostaglandin E2 Response as a Potential Risk
Marker for Chronic Periodontitis in Insulin-Dependent Diabetes Mellitus Patients. Ain Shams Dent. J. 225-232, Sept. 2003
23. K.S. Deiffallah, A. El Awady, K.A. Abdel-Ghaffar, M. El-Barbary, S. Shehata: Combined Autogenous Platelet-Rich Plasma Gel and Demineralized
Freezed-Dried Bone Allograft in Treatment of Periodontal Osseous Defects, Clinical Evaluation. Ain Shams Dent. J. 233-242, Sept. 2003
24. C. Hewitt, C.L. Wu, F. Hattab, W. Amin, K.A. Ghaffar, and N.S. Thakker: Co-inheritance of two rare genodermatoses (Papillon Lefevre Syndrome
and Oculocutaneous Albinism Type 1) in two families: a genetic study. British Journal of Dermatology, 2004
25. C. Hewitt, D. MaCormick, F. Hattab, P. Solan, K.A. Ghaffar, and N.S. Thakker: The role of cathepsin C in Papillon Lefevre syndrome Prepubertal
Periodontitis and Aggressive Periodontitis. Human Mutat. 23: 222-228, 2004.
26. Khaled Abdel Ghaffar, Salah Abdel Fatah, Ashraf Abdel Monaem “The Predominant Cultivable Microflora Around Implants in Papillion – Lefevre
Syndrome”. Egyptian Dental Journal:Vol.55, 1:15, Apil 2009
27. Ghaffar KA, Glascone A, Rose-Nelson C, Brown RS. : Panoramic Radiographic Representation of Progressive Periodontal Destruction in a Family
with Six Affected Papillion – Lefevre Siblings. J Clin Pediatr Dent 2009;34(1):61-66
28. Khaled Abdel Ghaffar, Salah Abdel Fatah, Ronald S. Brown, Ashraf Abdel Monaem: The Predominant Cultivable Microflora Around Implants in
Papillon– Lefevre Syndrome. The Journal of Implant & Advanced Clinical Dentistry May 2010 Vol.2, No.4;65-74
29. Fatma El-Tony, Hala Aboel-Alla, Khaled Abdel-Ghaffar: Periodontal inflammatory marker and cardiovascular disease. The international association
of dental research vol,114;1122-1123, June 2010
30. 30-Rania Fareid, Khaled Abdel Ghaffar, and Mohamed el Mofty: Clinical evaluation of platelet-rich plasma and acellular dermal matrix allograft in
the management of gingival recession. Egyptian Journal of Oral and Maxillofacial Surgery vol.2,81-86 May 2011
31. Mohamed Bahrawy, M. Mofty, Khaled Abdel-Ghaffar: The mutual effect of hyperlipidemia and proinflammatory cytokine related to periodontal
infection.Egyptian Journal of Oral and Maxillofacial Surgery vol.2,87-95 May 2011
32. Khaled A. Abdel Ghaffar, Hazem Ata, Sherine A. Nasry, Amani H. Nemat, Mahmoud K. el Ashiry: The Effect of Unifferentiated Mesenchymal Bone
Marrow Stem Cells on the Healing of Fresh Extraction Bony Sockets. Life Science Journal Vol. 9(3) 2012
33. Ahmed Y Gamal, Khaled A. Abdel-Ghaffar, Vincent J Iacono. A Novel Approach For Enhanced NanoParticle Sized Bone substitute adhesion to
chemically treated Peri-implantitis Affected Implant Surfaces ( An in-vitro Proof of Principle Study ) Journal of Periodontology Feb 2013
34. Brodie Miles, Khaled A. Abdel-Ghaffar, Ahmed Y Gamal, Bubk Baban, Christopher William Cutler. Blood Dendritic cells: “ Canary in the Coal Mine
“ To Protect Chronic Inflammatory Disease? Frontiers Microbiology Feb 2014
35. J.Crossman, A.Saleem, N.H.Felemban, S. Aldaghreer, E. Fawzi, M. Farid, K. Abdel Ghaffar, and T.H. El-Bialy,” Effect of Stem Cells and Ultrasound
on Dogs Periodontal ligament”. International Association for Dental Research paper # 190953 June 2014
36. A.Y.Gamal, K.A.Abdel-Ghaffar, V.J.Iacono “ Gingival crevicular fluid vascular endothelial cell growth factor-BB release profile following the use of
perforated barrier membranes during treatment of intrabony defects: a randomized clinical trial” Journal of Periodontal Research, July 2015
37. Ahmed. Y. Gamal, Khaled A. Abdel-Ghaffar, Osama Almarghany “ Crevicular fluid growth factor release profile following the use of platelets Rich
Fibrin (PRF) and Plasma rich growth factor (PRGF) in treating periodontal intra bony defects (Randomized Clinical Trial) Journal of periodontology
Dec. 2015
38. M. Al Bahrawy1, A.Y. Gamal1, K. Ghaffar1, G.E. Romanos2Hydroxyapatite as a Biomaterial to Improve Stem Cell-Related Tissue Engineering
(submitted for publication February 2016 )
39. A Novel Approach of Periodontal Osseous Wall Piezosplitting and EDTA Root Surface Etching in Management of Localized Intrabony Defects with
Wide Angulation (Randomized Clinical Trial) Ahmed Y Gamal *, Khaled A. Abdel-Ghaffar *, Mohamed MF Khedr**, Mahmoud T El Destawy**
Submitted for publication, Journal of periodontology, May 2018
40. Perforated Barrier Membranes in Association with Simvastatin gel and EDTA root surface etching in Treatment of Intrabony Defects (Clinical and
Biochemical Study) Ahmed Y Gamal *, Khaled A. Abdel-Ghaffar *, Mohamed Al Shahat**, Dalia Rasheed Issa *, Ahmed Abd el Azeez*, Vincent J
Iacono Submitted for publication, Journal of Periodontology, June 2018
41. Influence of Different Decontamination Approaches on Bone Substitute Adhesion to PeriImplantitis–Affected Implant Surfaces, An SEM Proof-of-
Principle Study Ahmed Y. Gamal* Khaled A. Abdel-Ghaffar *, Mahmoud T Al Destawy**, Froum Scott*** Submitted for publication, Journal of
Periodontology, June 2018
42. Dimensional Evaluation of Blood Clot Gap Distances within the Intrabony Defects Following Grafting and EDTA Root Surface Treatment -
Experimental Study in Dogs. Ahmed Y Gamal *, Khaled A. Abdel-Ghaffar *, Mohamed G Zouair#, Mohamed H Samalma**, Mahmoud T El Destawy
Accepted for publication, journal of periodontology, Jan. 2018
43. Adel-Khattab D, F. Giacomini, B. Peleska, R. Gildenhaar, G.Berger, C. Gomes, U. Linow, M. Hardt, J. Günster, M. Stiller, A. Houshmand, K.A.
Ghaffar, A.Gamal, M. EL-Mofty, C. Knabe. Development of a synthetic tissue-engineered 3D printed bioceramic-based bone graft with
homogenously distributed osteoblasts and mineralizing bone matrix in vitro. J Tissue Eng Regen Med. 2016 Nov 15. doi: 10.1002/term.2362. (IF
4.71)
44. Adel-Khattab D, B. Peleska, M. Kampschulte, M. Stiller, R. Gildenhaar, G. Berger, C. Gomes, U.Linow, M. Hardt, J. Günster, A. Houshmand, K.A.
Ghaffar, A.Gamal, M. EL-Mofty, C. Knabe. An intrinsic angiogenesis approach and varying bioceramic scaffold architecture affect blood vessel
formation in bone tissue engineering in vivo. Key Engineering Materials 2017, Vol. 720, pp. 58-64 (IF 0.39).
45. D. Adel-Khattab D, F. Giacomini, B. Peleska, R. Gildenhaar, G. Berger, C. Gomes, U. Linow, M. Hardt, J. Günster, A. Houshmand, M. Stiller, K.A.
Ghaffar, A. Gamal, M. EL-Mofty, C. Knabe. Development of a synthetic tissue-engineered 3D printed calciumalkaliphosphate-based bone graft with
homogenously distributed osteoblasts and mineralizing bone matrix in vitro. Key Engineering Materials 2017, Vol. 720, pp. 82-89 (IF 0.39).
46. Effect of Intraligamentary Injection of Fibroblasts On Cementum Thickness
Authors (FIRST NAME INITIAL LAST NAME): W. QAYYUM, J. J. Crossman, A. Saleem, N. Feldman. S. Aldaghreer. E.M. Fawzi, M. S. Farid.
K. A. Abdel Ghaffar, T. H. El-Bialy
47. Effect of gingival fibroblasts and ultrasound on dogs’ root resorption during orthodontic treatment. Authors, Jacqueline Crossman. Ali H. Hassan,
Ali Salewm, Nayef Felemban, Saleh Aldaghreer, Elham Fawzi.Mamdouh Farid, Khaled Abdel-Ghaffar, AUSAMA Gargoum, and Tarek El-Bialy.
48. Effect of Inflammation on Gingival Mesenchymal Stem/Progenitor Cells’ Proliferation and Migration through Microperforated Membranes: An In Vitro
Study. Authors, M. Al Bahrawy, K. Ghaffar, A. Gamal, K. El-Sayed, and V. Iacono.
49. Regenerative potential of cultured gingival fibroblasts in the treatment of periodontal intrabony defects (randomized clinical and biochemical trial).
Authors, Mahetab Abdal‐Wahab, Khaled A. Abdel Ghaffar, Ola M. Ezzatt, Ahmed Abdel Aziz Hassan, Mervat Mohamed S. El Ansary, Ahmed Y.
Gamal.
50. Investigating the Significance of Aerosols in Determining the Coronavirus Fatality Rate Among Three European Countries. Authors, Wenzhao Li1 ·
Rejoice Thomas2 · Hesham El‐Askary1,3,4 · Thomas Piechota1 · Daniele Struppa1 · Khaled A. A. Abdel Ghaffar

References

External links
 Khaled Abdel Ghaffar's Resume

Living people
Academic staff of Ain Shams University
1962 births
Higher education ministers of Egypt
Research ministers of Egypt
Health ministers of Egypt
21st-century Egyptian politicians